Geraldine Sherman (born Geraldine Judith Schoenmann) known as Dena Hammerstein, is a British actress and writer, and theatre producer. She was the third wife of James Hammerstein, and after his death became president/CEO of James Hammerstein Productions Ltd.

Early life
Sherman was born in Staines, Middlesex. Her parents were refugees from Czechoslovakia. Her father Kurt Wilhelm Schoenmann was born in Teplitz in Bohemia in 1915. He married Edith Peller, later coming to Britain to escape Nazi persecution, but was interned in March 1940 because his nationality was Austrian. He was then transported to Australia on the infamous 1940 Dunera voyage, and held in Loveday and Tatura internment camps until 1942.

Notes:

Actress

Writer
When It's Over, by Geraldine Sherman and Eduardo Machado:
 Long Wharf Theatre, New Haven, Connecticut: playreading 1985–1986, workshop 1986–1987
 Finborough Theatre, London, 23 October – 16 November 1991

Thin Ice, 1995 film

Theatre producer

Philanthropist
Dena Hammerstein worked as a volunteer in New York City hospitals for over 15 years, and in 2003 received the United Hospital Funds New Leadership Group's Humanitarian Award. She is Founder of Only Make Believe, a non-profit organisation that creates and performs interactive theatre for children in hospitals and care facilities, inspired by her early work as an actress in the UK touring special-needs schools.

Personal life
In 1970, a choreographer friend invited her to holiday in New York where she met Jamie Hammerstein.

Married theatre director James Hammerstein who directed her in Butley, and has one son Simon Hammerstein (born 1977).

Notes

References

External links

Geraldine Sherman at BFI

Pictures
Extra in A Hard Day's Night: Girl Outside Secondhand Shop, 1964 from A Hard Day's Night Cast and Extras
Publicity photo for King of the River, 1966
Publicity photo for Take a Girl Like You, 1970
Dena in 2013
Dena

Living people
Actresses from London
British film actresses
British television actresses
British stage actresses
Hammerstein family (show business)
Theatre managers and producers
British people of Czech-Jewish descent
Women theatre managers and producers
Year of birth missing (living people)